Zdeněk "Frank" Souček (Brno, 9 September 1917 – Macquarie Island, 24 December 1967) was a Czech-Australian physician, polar and tropics explorer and traveler.

Souček gained his doctorate in 1947 at Charles University in Prague. He started to work in Prachatice where he got to know his future wife. He emigrated to the West Germany in 1949 and one year later to Australia where he joined Australian National Antarctic Research Expeditions. He spent year 1952 on Macquarie Island, however he worked on New Ireland during 1953–1959. Besides tropical medicine he did an anthropology research here. After his return to ANARE, he participated in 12 Antarctic expeditions serving mostly as a physician. He studied influence of extreme conditions on human organism and bacteria in gastrointestinal tracts of polar birds and mammals. He worked mainly on Macquarie Island and at Wilkes Station.

He died of a heart attack on Macquarie Island. A cremation urn with his ashes is placed in Vodňany, Czech Republic.

Places named after Souček 
Several places are named after Zdeněk Souček:
Soucek Bay on Macquarie Island.
Mount Soucek in Tula Mountains, Antarctica
Soucek Ravine on Ardery Island

References

1917 births
1967 deaths
People from Brno in health professions
People from the Margraviate of Moravia
Explorers of Antarctica
Czechoslovak emigrants to Australia
Czech explorers
Czechoslovak physicians
Australian explorers
Australian tropical physicians
Charles University alumni